The U.S. Army Pikes Peak Research Laboratory, or simply the "Pikes Peak Lab", is a modern medical research laboratory for the assessment of the impact of high altitude on human physiological and medical parameters of military interest. It is a satellite facility of the U.S. Army Research Institute of Environmental Medicine (USARIEM), located in Natick, Massachusetts. 
The Pikes Peak Lab is at the summit of Pikes Peak  in central Colorado, USA.

The building is well insulated and protected from the elements, supplied with electrical power, and heated by natural gas.

Also occupying the summit is the commercially operated lodging, the Summit House, for the 500 to 3000 tourists who come daily to the summit in the summer time by car, cog railway, or trail hiking.

US Forest Service rangers of the Pike National Forest have general administrative oversight of the greater area. The Pikes Peak Lab was renamed the USARIEM Maher Memorial Altitude Laboratory in honor of John T. Maher, Ph.D., director of USARIEM's Altitude Research Division from 1981 to 1983.

References

Buildings and structures in El Paso County, Colorado
Pike's Peak
Pikes Peak
Pike National Forest
Medical and health organizations based in Colorado
Military installations in Colorado
1969 establishments in Colorado